Gregory Philip Smith (born 16 November 1988 in Leicester) is an English former cricketer. He was a right-handed opening batsman and occasional leg break bowler who last played for Nottinghamshire.

He attended Oundle School and then studied at Durham University, where he represented Durham UCCE.

In 2008, Smith represented the English U-19 cricket team against New Zealand, scoring 157 and 150 not out in the test matches and 81 in a Youth ODI.

Smith came through the junior set up at Leicestershire, and topped the first-class national batting averages in 2010. He continued to flourish in 2011, regularly batting in the number 3 position.

Smith and Josh Cobb hold the record for the best opening partnership in a limited overs match, for Leicestershire. The pair scored 235 against Somerset in May 2013, both scoring centuries.

He announced his retirement from the game in July 2017.

Career Best Performances
as of 27 September 2013

References

External links

1988 births
Living people
Cricketers from Leicester
Alumni of the College of St Hild and St Bede, Durham
English cricketers
Leicestershire cricketers
Durham MCCU cricketers
Lankan Cricket Club cricketers
Badureliya Sports Club cricketers
Colombo Cricket Club cricketers
Nottinghamshire cricketers
People educated at Oundle School